Dwan is both a surname and a given name. Notable people with the name include:

Allan Dwan (1885–1981), pioneering Canadian-born American film director, producer and screenwriter
Dorothy Dwan (1906–1981), American actress of the 1920s
Jack Dwan (1921–1993), American professional basketball player
John Dwan, one of the founders of the 3M corporation
Kenny Dwan (born 1948), former British rower and Queen's Bargemaster
Lisa Dwan (born 1977), Irish actress
Tom Dwan (born 1986), American professional poker player
Dwan Edwards (born 1981), American National League Football player
Virginia Dwan (born October 18, 1931), Founder of avant-garde art galleries in Los Angeles and New York
Robert Dwan (1915-2005), Director of Groucho Marx's radio and TV show, You Bet Your Life

Fictional characters:
Jessica Lange's character in King Kong (1976 film)

See also
John Dwan Office Building, Minnesota, United States
 DWAN, a radio station in the Philippines